Molter is a surname. Notable people with the surname include:

 Dorothy Molter, the "Root Beer Lady" of Knife Lake in Minnesota
 Johann Melchior Molter, German baroque composer and violinist
 Károly Molter (1890–1981), Hungarian writer
 William Molter (1910–1961), American horse trainer